Dane Schmidt, also known by his stage name Jamestown Story, is an American singer-songwriter from Minneapolis, Minnesota. Schmidt released his first album under the name And Then I Turned Seven in late 2003 and has since released 7 albums as well as numerous singles and EP's as the main vocalist and songwriter of  Jamestown Story. As an A&R, Schmidt has signed songwriters Jordan Schmidt, Zach Kale, along with artists Gabby Barrett, Mitchell Tenpenny, The Band Camino, and Adam Doleac. He now resides in Nashville, TN.

History

2003–2007: Formation and early years
Schmidt released his first album, Broken Summer, under the moniker And Then I Turned Seven in August 2003 before leaving his hometown of Duluth, Minnesota, to attend college at Moorhead State University. While at school, Schmidt started playing shows in the Moorhead, Minnesota, and Fargo, North Dakota, area to promote his music. He ended up leaving Moorhead State University after his first semester to attend community college in Duluth while focusing on his music. In the fall of 2004 Schmidt put Broken Summer up for stream on PureVolume, a fast-growing music website, and quickly became one of the site's top unsigned artists. Jamestown Story has since had over 2,500,000 million plays on PureVolume. In late 2004 he decided to take time off from college to start touring and focus on his music full-time. After two solo tours on the East Coast and in the South, recruited local musicians Pat Tarnowski, Kieren Smith, Trevor McKenzie, and Indianapolis, Indiana-based drummer Chris Lee to join the band. The band independently played over 100 shows and logged almost 65,000 miles in 2005 alone. The band started working on their EP titled The Jamestown Story in the fall of 2005 with producer/engineer Jordan Schmidt, who has since recorded all of Jamestown Story's music. The EP was released on October 30, 2005, and soon after, Trevor McKenzie left the band. McKenzie was replaced by local musician Sam Dean while the band continued to tour the US before putting their music on the popular social networking site Myspace in early 2006. The band built a loyal fan base on the site and, within a year, became one of the site's top 50 unsigned artists, receiving millions of plays through consistent touring and constant self-promotion. Jamestown Story has since received over 12,000,000 plays on Myspace. In the spring of 2006, Sam Dean left the band and was replaced by Chad Snell. The band continued to tour independently, playing more than 100 shows before changing the name to Jamestown Story on January 1, 2007. After a series of difficult tours in 2007, Tarnowski, Snell and Lee left the band in the spring of 2007.

2007–2008: One Last Breath and Sing It Loud
Schmidt and Smith started working on the band's next release, One Last Breath while Smith simultaneously recorded an EP for his new project, Sing It Loud. After signing up with music distributed Tunecore, One Last Breath was released on August 9, 2007, along with "Sing It Loud"'s self-titled EP, which Schmidt played drums on. Schmidt became the band's drummer and they both moved down to Minneapolis, Minnesota, where Sing It Loud quickly began to build a large following before signing with Epitaph Records in early 2008. Soon after the signing, Smith left Jamestown Story to focus on Sing It Loud and shortly thereafter Schmidt left Sing It Loud to once again focus on Jamestown Story full-time. In the spring of 2008 Jamestown Story's song “In Loving Memory” was featured on the popular TV show One Tree Hill. Schmidt went back into the studio and released The Prologue EP on May 25, 2008 before starting to work on his next full-length album. On August 19, 2008, "In Loving Memory" was featured on ABC's The Secret Life of the American Teenager. After six months of writing and recording, Schmidt released Love vs. Life, his first solo album as Jamestown Story. The album eventually sold over 70,000 songs on iTunes, received millions of plays on Myspace, and had songs featured on Dr. Phil, Jersey Shore, The Real World, Keeping Up With The Kardashians, 16 & Pregnant, True Life, I Used To Be Fat, The Challenge, Bad Girls Club, 90210, Bad Sex, and Couples Therapy.

2009–2011
Schmidt continued to promote and sell his music independently throughout 2009, releasing a split EP on July 9, 2009, with fellow Myspace artist Stephen Jerzak, as well as the Never Enough EP on December 28, 2009. In late 2009 Schmidt met Brandyn Anderson, a local Minneapolis-based musician, and the two began playing Jamestown Story shows as a duo. Anderson officially joined in 2010 and the two started writing for the next release before heading to Yuigahama Beach, Japan on August 6, 2010, to play two shows. After returning to the US, Schmidt and Anderson continued working on their next release with Jordan Schmidt, which was recorded at Onkio Haus in Ginza, Tokyo. The album, Find A Way, was independently released on January 11, 2011. Their song "Ashamed" was featured on an episode of Jersey Shore that originally aired on September 1, 2011. The album has since had songs featured on The Challenge: Rivals, Keeping Up With The Kardashians, Bad Girls Club, Teen Mom, Life Unexpected, Virgin Territory, Are You the One?, The Challenge: Rivals II, Best Ink, multiple The Real World episodes, and the video game Rollercoaster Dreams. On November 24, 2011, Jamestown Story released an EP titled A Walk Through Time before Schmidt decided to move to Nashville, Tennessee.

2012–present

Schmidt moved to Nashville on January 2, 2012, and started writing for the band's next release. Schmidt made frequent writing trips back to Minneapolis to work with Anderson before they began recording the album in March 2012. The two wrote and recorded 10 songs before scrapping half of them and continued to write more material. They released another split EP with Stephen Jerzak on August 28, 2012, titled The Nashville Sessions before Anderson amicably parted ways with the band. On September 9, 2012, the song "I'll Help Get You Through" was featured on multiple episodes of Dr. Phil. Schmidt continued to write and record throughout the rest of 2012 and the album Show Me Tomorrow was released on December 12, 2012. Throughout 2013, Schmidt wrote and recorded with numerous Nashville songwriters and released an EP of those songs titled Jamestown Story & Friends on September 9, 2013. The day before, Schmidt released a single song and video for "Who I Am" which focuses on suicide and depression, a close personal topic of Schmidt's. On September 9, 2013, Schmidt released the Jamestown Story & Friends EP. On November 11, 2013, he re-released a Christmas album titled A Jamestown Story Christmas. On July 29, 2016, Jamestown Story released its latest EP, Flashbacks. 

 On July 10, 2013, the song "Nothing's Forever" was featured on an episode of The Challenge: Rivals II.
 On September 18, 2013, the song "Scarred" was featured on an episode of The Challenge: Rivals II.
 On April 1, 2014, the song "Falling feat. Corey Wagar" was featured on an episode of The Real World: Ex-Plosion.
 On January 20, 2015, the song "Barefoot and Bruised" was featured on an episode of The Challenge: Battle of the Exes II.

Members

Current
 Dane Schmidt - lead vocals, acoustic guitar, piano, drums (2003–present)

Former
 Brandyn Anderson - piano (2010–2012)
 Kieren Smith - violin, guitar (2005–2008)
 Pat Tarnowski - guitar (2005–2007)
 Chris Lee - drums (2005–2007)
 Chad Snell - bass (2006–2007)
 Sam Dean - bass (2005-2006)
 Trevor MacKenzie - bass (2005)

Discography

Albums
Broken Summer (2007)
Love vs. Life (2008)
Find A Way (2011)
A Walk Through Time (2011)
A Jamestown Story Christmas (2012)
Show Me Tomorrow (2012)
Flashbacks (2016)

EPs

Solo
The Jamestown Story (2005)
One Last Breath (2007)
The Prologue (2008)
Never Enough (2009)
Jamestown Story & Friends (2013)
The Recollection (2017)

Split EPs
Stephen Jerzak & Jamestown Story EP (2009)
The Nashville Sessions (2012)
Hard Days EP (2013)

Compilations
A Collection Of Covers (2011)
The EP Collection (2011)
Spotify Collection (2013)

Usage in media

In The First Time, the song "Head Spin" was played on the radio while Aubrey and Ronny were talking.

In the Life Unexpected episode "Home Inspected", the song "I Don't Want To Lose You" is played as Natasha tells Kate about Lux's time in foster care.

The song "In Loving Memory" was played in the fifth season episode of One Tree Hill titled "What Do You Go Home To?".

Battle Creek'''s episode "Mama's Boy" featured the song "The Hard Days" at the end of the episode.

The song "Scarred" was played in the MET-Art production The Contract'', which featured Iwia A and Franck Franco.

A few Jamestown Story songs were used in MTV reality television series Jersey Shore. The song "Unforgettable Night" was played in the Season Two episode titled "Sleeping With The Enemy". The song "Don't Say Goodbye" was played in the Season Two episode titled "Back Into The Fold". The song "Ashamed" was played in the Season Four episodes titled "Crime and Punishment" and "And the Wall Won".

References

External links
jamestownstory.com
Jamestown Story on Facebook
Jamestown Story on Twitter
Jamestown Story on YouTube
Jamestown Story on SoundCloud`

Indie rock musical groups from Minnesota
Musical groups established in 2003
Musicians from Minneapolis
2003 establishments in Minnesota
People from Nashville, Tennessee